Kodamaea kakaduensis is an ascomycetous yeast species first isolated from Australian Hibiscus flowers. It is heterothallic, haploid, similar to other Kodamaea species and to Candida restingae. Its buds are often produced on short protuberances, and a true mycelium is formed. It differs from other species by the assimilation of trehalose, melezitose, and xylitol, and is reproductively isolated. Its type strain is UWO (PS) 98–119.2.

References

Further reading

Kurtzman, Cletus, Jack W. Fell, and Teun Boekhout, eds. The yeasts: a taxonomic study. Vol. 1. Elsevier, 2011.
Liu, Dongyou, ed. Molecular detection of human fungal pathogens. CRC Press, 2011.
Rosa, Carlos. Biodiversity and ecophysiology of yeasts. Vol. 1. Berlin: Springer, 2006.

External links

MycoBank

Saccharomycetes